USC Basketball may refer to:

 South Carolina Gamecocks men's basketball, the collegiate men's basketball program of the University of South Carolina (often referred to as "SC" or "USC" in athletics)
 South Carolina Gamecocks women's basketball, the collegiate women's basketball program of the University of South Carolina (often referred to as "SC" or "USC" in athletics)
 USC Trojans men's basketball, the collegiate men's basketball program of the University of Southern California
 USC Trojans women's basketball, the collegiate women's basketball program of the University of Southern California